Maria Nicklisch (1904–1995) was a German stage actress. She also appeared in several films.

Selected filmography
 Kitty and the World Conference (1939)

References

Bibliography
  Arthur Holmberg. The Theatre of Robert Wilson. Cambridge University Press, 1996.

External links

1904 births
1995 deaths
German film actresses
German stage actresses